Jean LaMarr (born 1945) is a Northern Paiute/Achomawi artist and activist from California. She creates murals, prints, dioramas, sculptures, and interactive installations. She is an enrolled member of the Susanville Indian Rancheria.

Early life 
Born in Susanville, California, Jean LaMarr was given the name Pahime Gutne (Purple Flower Girl). Her family was poor. She created her first mural when she was in fourth grade called "Sir Frances Drake Christianizing the Indians" and the experience was meaningful to her. She experienced racism from her teachers at school and had to hide her art making when at home from her father, who wanted her to pursue a more practical occupation.

Education 
LaMarr studied at San Jose City College from 1970 to 1973; at the University of California, Berkeley, from 1973 to 1976; and at the Kala Art Institute from 1976 to 1986. LaMarr's instructors at UC Berkeley weren't supportive of her representational art. Lamarr was attending school in San Jose during the Occupation of Alcatraz and she supported that movement. She then joined a group of artists that protested discrimination. The 1969 Third World strike in Berkeley influence her work, as did the Chicano artists Ester Hernández and Malaquias Montoya.

Career 

Between 1973 and 1990 she taught at such institutions as the College of Marin, San Francisco State University, the California College of Arts and Crafts, Lassen Community College, California Correctional Center, and the Institute of American Indian Arts. An active muralist, she is also known for her prints. She is drawn to the democratic quality of both media and has said, "I believe that art is for everyone. Art shouldn't be just for the museums or the rich, it should be for everyone and in everybody's home. That is why I started doing murals. That is also why I got into printmaking, because it was a way of gathering minds, a way of raising consciousness about what is happening with the Earth, Indian rights, and the Indian woman."

Curator Jan Rindfleisch writes of LaMarr, "Jean LaMarr has honored and supported tribal communities for four decades. From drawing Indigenous youth during the 1960s to creating a compelling series of Bear Dance posters years later, her pictorial narrative counters the long-standing erasure of Indigenous presence. She often focused on women, celebrating and documenting their history and survival."

LaMarr is the founder of the Native American Graphic Workshop.

In 2022, the California Society of Printmakers recognized LaMarr's contributions to the field of fine art printmaking with a lifetime, honorary membership.

Personal life 
LaMarr married DeeRoy "Spence" Spencer, a Navajo veteran of the Vietnam War and designer. The couple has one son.

After Spencer's death in 2015, she has fought the Navajo Nation in court over where he was to be buried. The Navajo Nation ruled that he must be buried in Arizona in the community in which he was born, but LaMarr argued that he wished to be buried in their Susanville community.

Works

Prints 
 Sacred Places Where We Pray, photo etching, 1990 
 500 Years of Resistance: Through Women's Eyes, screenprint, 1992, printed with René Castro at Mission Gráfica

Murals 
 Our Ancestors, Our Future, mural, Lasson Street, Susanville created with Jack Malotte
 The Ohlone Journey, mural, Berkeley, California

Exhibitions 
 1987 – The Ethnic Idea, curated by Andrée Maréchal-Workman, including Lauren Adams, Robert Colescott, Dewey Crumpler, Mildred Howard, Oliver Lee Jackson, Mary Lovelace O'Neal, Joe Sam, Elisabeth Zeilon, Tom Holland, Celeste Conner, Jean LaMarr, Sylvia Lark, Leta Ramos, Judy Foosaner, Joseph Goldyne, Belinda Chlouber, Carlos Villa, Berkeley Art Center, Berkeley, California
 1995 – Violetly Volatile: Selected Mixed Media Works from 1974 to 1995 (1995), solo retrospective at C.N. Gorman Museum, Davis, California
 2019–2020 – When I Remember I See Red: American Indian Art and Activism in California, Crocker Art Museum, Sacramento, California
 2021 – The Art of Jean LaMarr, Nevada Museum of Art, Reno, Nevada
 Princess Pale Moon exhibition, Heard Museum, Phoenix, Arizona

Further reading 
 
 The Art of Jean La Marr, Nevada: Nevada Museum of Art, 2020. .

References

1945 births
Living people
Native American women artists
Native American painters
Native American printmakers
20th-century American painters
20th-century American printmakers
20th-century American women artists
21st-century American painters
21st-century American printmakers
21st-century American women artists
Northern Paiute people
Pit River tribes
San Jose City College alumni
University of California, Berkeley alumni
College of Marin faculty
San Francisco State University faculty
California College of the Arts faculty
People from Susanville, California
Painters from California
American women printmakers
American women academics
20th-century Native Americans
21st-century Native Americans
20th-century Native American women
21st-century Native American women